Technique Polytechnic Institute is a co-educational private diploma engineering college located at Hooghly district in West Bengal, India. It is affiliated to West Bengal State Council of Technical Education and approved by All India Council for Technical Education.

Academics
Technique Polytechnic Institute offers undergraduate diplomas in several streams. It also offers vocational training programmes in several courses. All full-time diploma engineering programs are accredited by the National Board of Accreditation.

Facilities
 Library
 Laboratories
 Class Rooms
 Canteen
 Hostel
 Sports

Gallery
 Jelet Rank
 Pictures
 Video
 Video in Bengali

See also

References

External links
Official Website
Official website WBSCTE

Private engineering colleges in India
Engineering colleges in West Bengal
Universities and colleges in Hooghly district
Educational institutions established in 2008
2008 establishments in West Bengal